Pleasant Dreams: Nightmares is a collection of fantasy and horror short stories by American writer Robert Bloch. It was released in 1960 and was the author's second book published by Arkham House.  It was released in an edition of 2,060 copies.

The stories originally appeared in several magazines between 1946 and 1958.  The collection includes Bloch's 1959 Hugo Award winning story, "That Hell-Bound Train".

Contents

Pleasant Dreams: Nightmares contains the following tales:

 "Sweets to the Sweet"
 "The Dream-Makers"
 "The Sorcerer's Apprentice"
 "I Kiss Your Shadow"
 "Mr. Steinway"
 "The Proper Spirit"
 "Catnip"
 "The Cheaters"
 "Hungarian Rhapsody"
 "The Lighthouse" (with Edgar Allan Poe)
 "The Hungry House"
 "The Sleeping Beauty"
 "Sweet Sixteen"
 "That Hell-Bound Train"
 "Enoch"

Sources

1960 short story collections
Fantasy short story collections
Horror short story collections
Short story collections by Robert Bloch
Arkham House books